Pickle may refer to:
 Pickle, a pickled cucumber in the United States and Canada
 Pickle, a sweet, vinegary pickled chutney popular in Great Britain, such as Branston Pickle, also known as "sweet pickle" or "ploughman's pickle"
 South Asian pickles, also known as achar, any of several savory condiments popular in South Asia

Pickle may also refer to:

Food
 Any food that has undergone pickling

People 
 J. J. Pickle (1913–2005), United States representative from Texas
 William H. Pickle, 37th United States Sergeant at Arms (2003–2007)
 Alastair Ruadh MacDonnell (1725–1761), Scottish Jacobite who became a British government secret agent, identified as "Pickle"
 Alonzo H. Pickle (1843–?), Canadian-American soldier and member of the 1st Battalion Minnesota Infantry who fought in the American Civil War

Software
 Pickle (app), a crowdsourced job app
 Pickle (Python), a serialization computer library module

Entertainment
 Pickle Rick, an episode of Rick and Morty
 The Pickle, a 1993 film
 "The Pickle Song", an alternative title for "The Motorcycle Song" by Arlo Guthrie, appearing on Alice's Restaurant (1967) and The Best of Arlo Guthrie (1977), among others

Military 
 HMS Pickle, various ships of the British Royal Navy

Sports 
 Rundown or pickle, in baseball

See also 
 Pickling (metal), a metal surface treatment
 Pickles (disambiguation)
 Pickler (disambiguation)
 List of pickled foods
 Pickleball, a game with similarities to tennis
 Pickle-in-the-middle, a three-person game
 Pickel (disambiguation)